Federico Mayor Zaragoza (born 27 January 1934 in Barcelona) is a scientist, scholar, politician, diplomat, and poet from Spain. He served as the Director-General of the United Nations Educational, Scientific, and Cultural Organization (UNESCO) from 1987 to 1999. After his tenure as Director-General, he continued to participate in various peace-related organizations such as the Foundation for a Culture of Peace and the International Decade for the Promotion of a Culture of Peace and Non-Violence for the Children of the World, as a member of their honorary boards. Additionally, he serves as the honorary chairman of the Académie de la Paix.

Biography

Federico Mayor Zaragoza was born in Barcelona, Spain. He obtained a Ph.D. in pharmacy from the Complutense University of Madrid in 1958. In 1963 he became professor of biochemistry at the School of Pharmacy of the University of Granada, and in 1968 was elected rector of that university, a post he held until 1972. The following year he was appointed professor in biochemistry at the Autonomous University of Madrid. In 1974 he co-founded the Severo Ochoa Molecular Biology Centre at the Autonomous University of Madrid and the Spanish High Council for Scientific Research. The main focus of Professor Mayor's scientific research has been on molecular brain disease, and he was responsible for drawing up the Spanish National Plan for Mental Health Prevention. He is a member of the Club of Rome, the Club of Budapest, a founder member of the Issyk-Kul Forum. In 2005 he received the Prize Creu de Sant Jordi from the Generalitat de Catalunya. He is an honorary member of several scientific societies and a member of several academies, among them, the World Academy of Art and Science. He has also received several honorary doctorates (Honoris Causa). He is honorary president of the University of Granada.

Spanish political career

Federico Mayor Zaragoza was undersecretary of Education and Science in the Spanish Government (1974–1975) during the Francoist dictatorship, UCD deputy for Granada region in the Spanish Parliament (1977–1978), Adviser to the President of the Government (1977–1978), Minister of Education and Science (1981–1982) and CDS deputy in the European Parliament (1987).

UN career

In 1978 Federico Mayor Zaragoza became deputy director-general of UNESCO. In 1987 he was elected director-general of UNESCO and re-elected for a second mandate in 1993. After deciding not to run for a third term, in 1999 he returned to Spain to create the Foundation for a Culture of Peace, of which he is chairman.

UNESCO

During his 12 years as head of UNESCO (1987–1999) Federico Mayor Zaragoza gave new life to the organization's mission to "build a bastion of peace in the minds of all people", putting the institution at the service of peace, tolerance, human rights and peaceful coexistence, working within the scope of its powers and remaining faithful to its original goals. Under Mayor's guidance, UNESCO created the Culture of Peace Programme, whose objectives revolve around four main themes: education for peace; human rights and democracy; the fight against isolation and poverty; the defense of cultural diversity and intercultural dialogue; and conflict prevention and the consolidation of peace.

Within the framework of this strategy, numerous international meetings and conferences were held on subjects such as education in non-violence, the eradication of discrimination and the promotion of pluralism and international cooperation. The result of these meetings was some 30 Declarations expressing a will to promote education, science, culture, research and teaching, justice and the "moral and intellectual solidarity" to which the constitution of UNESCO refers.

On 10 November 1998, the UN General Assembly declared the years 2001–2010, International Decade for the Promotion of a Culture of Peace and Non-Violence for the Children of the World and, on 13 September 1999, it adopted the Declaration and Programme of Action on a Culture of Peace, which embodies Mayor's greatest aspirations from both a conceptual and practical standpoint.

Later life

In 2000, Federico Mayor Zaragoza founded the Foundation for a Culture of Peace, serving as its president.

In 2002, Federico Mayor Zaragoza was appointed to chair the European Research Council Expert Group (ERCEG). The European Research Council Expert Group (ERCEG) was set up in December 2002, during the Danish EU presidency, on the initiative of Helge Sander, the Danish
Minister for Science, Technology and Innovation. Its creation was a follow-up to the conclusions on the status of the European Research Area (ERA) reached by the Council of Ministers meeting on
competitiveness, held in Brussels on 26 November 2002, and the recommendations on the basic principles of a possible European Research Council (ERC) agreed in October 2002 at a conference in Copenhagen organized by the Danish Research Councils. The European Union has identified the need to strengthen the competitiveness of Europe and to become a knowledge-based economy. In view of the importance of a 
strong research capacity for economic stability and growth, the Expert Group recommends a new European dimension for research funding. The first and main task for the ERC should be to support investigator-driven research of the highest quality selected through European competition.

In 2002, Federico Mayor Zaragoza co-founded with Boutros Boutros Ghali, John Brademas, Edward J. Nell, Karim Errouaki  and Alain Chanlat the Centre Humanism, Management & Globalization (HMG) at HEC-Montreal. The aim of HGM was to support projects and develop programs based on policies that would humanize the process of globalization across its many dimensions- economic, ecological, social, political, cultural and organizational. Responsibility  for putting humanism into practice rests largely on the shoulders of our leaders and managers. They are the link between macroscopic, societal phenomena and everyday activities that, in contrast are resolutely microscopic in nature. The Mission of HGM was to link these two levels of concern. The approach was to present and disseminate management ideas and practices that are inspired by values and ethics that respect the principles of both universal and pluralist humanism. This is the only way to make a real contribution and create a true Culture of Peace.

In 2005, Federico Mayor Zaragoza is designed co-president for the UN High Level Group for the Alliance of Civilizations, by Kofi Annan, the United Nations Secretary-General. The Alliance of Civilizations (AoC) is an initiative proposed by the President of the Government of Spain, José Luis Rodríguez Zapatero, at the 59th General Assembly of the United Nations (UN) in 2005. It was co-sponsored by the Turkish Prime Minister, Recep Tayyip Erdoğan. The initiative seeks to galvanize international action against extremism through the forging of international, intercultural and inter religious dialogue and cooperation. The Alliance places a particular emphasis on defusing tensions between the Western and Islamic worlds. To fulfill the objective of the initiative, the UN Secretary-General Kofi Annan assembled a High-Level Group (HLG) consisting of 20 eminent persons drawn from policy making, academia, civil society, religious leadership, and the media. A full range of religions and civilizations were represented. Among the members were former Iranian president Mohammad Khatami, who proposed the Dialogue Among Civilizations initiative, Archbishop Desmond Tutu, South African Nobel laureate, Prof. Pan Guang, who obtained the Saint Petersburg-300 Medal for Contribution to China-Russia Relations, and Arthur Schneier, who is the founder and president of the "Appeal of Conscience Foundation" and who gained the "Presidential Citizens Medal". The HLG met 5 times between November 2005 and November 2006, and produced a report prioritizing relations between the Western and Muslim societies. The first meeting of the HLG of the AoC occurred in Spain in November 2005. The second meeting was in Doha, Qatar from 25 to 27 February 2006 with the agenda of aiming to find ways to calm the cartoon crisis between West and Islamic world.[2] The third meeting took place in Dakar, Senegal from 28 to 30 May 2006. At the final meeting in November 2006 in Istanbul, the members presented their final report to Kofi Annan and to Prime Ministers José Luis Rodríguez Zapatero and Recep Tayyip Erdoğan. The report outlined recommendations and practical solutions on how the Western and Islamic societies can solve misconceptions and misunderstandings between them. According to the report, "politics, not religion, is at the heart of growing Muslim-Western divide", although a large emphasis is maintained on religion. 

In 2007, Federico Mayor Zaragoza co-founded with Boutros Boutros Ghali, Michel Rocard, John Brademas, Robert Mundell, Edward J. Nell, Karim Errouaki, Mohamed Hassad, and Tomas Solis the Tangier Expo 2012 International Support Committee. Federico Mayor Zaragoza  was designed by HM King Mohammed VI of Morocco as the President of the Tangier Expo 2012 International Support Committee. HM King Mohammed VI of Morocco has decided in 2006 to submit the candidacy of Tangiers, the City of the Strait of Gibraltar for the organization of the 2012 International Exhibition. The theme of the exhibition was Routes of the World, Cultures Connecting. For a More United World.

Federico Mayor Zaragoza is a member of the Fondation Chirac's honour committee, ever since the foundation was launched in 2008 by former French president Jacques Chirac in order to promote world peace. He also participates as jury member for the Prize for Conflict Prevention awarded every year by this foundation.

In 2011, Federico Mayor Zaragoza was appointed the President of the International Commission against the Death Penalty. The commission, which is supported by 18 states, is promoting the universal abolition of the death penalty. It is also promoting abolition in legislation in those countries where a moratorium already exists. Federico Mayor Zaragoza, speaking at the Parliamentary Assembly on 14 April 2011, he highlighted the role of the Council of Europe, OSCE and EU to make Europe a death penalty free zone, except for one country and argued that despite progress achieved in the last decades– two thirds of the countries in the world have already abolished the death penalty – efforts must be intensified until its total eradication. He went on to argue that "The right to life is the most basic of all rights, because it is a pre-requisite for the exercise of all the other human rights." He pointed out two key arguments for abolition: death penalty is irreversible – mistakes cannot be repaired – and there in no evidence of its deterrent value to prevent criminality.

In 2013 Federico Mayor Zaragoza joined the Nizami Ganjavi International Center Board along with Ismail Serageldin, Vaira Vike-Freiberga, Tarja Halonen, Suleyman Demirel, Roza Otunbayeva, Ambassador Walter Fust. It is a cultural, non-profit, non-political organization dedicated to the memory of Persian poet, Nizami Ganjavi, the study and dissemination of his works, the promotion of the principles embodied in his writings, the advancement of culture and creative expression, and the promotion of learning, dialogue, tolerance and understanding between cultures and people.

At the first annual Peace Education Conference, held virtually in September 2021, Federico Mayor Zaragoza and Ambassador Karim Errouaki,  were keynote speakers.

Foundation for a Culture of Peace

It was founded in March 2000 and ascribed to the protectorate for foundations of the Community of Madrid's regional Department of Education. The Foundation's objective is to contribute to building and consolidating a Culture of Peace through reflection, research, education and on-the-spot action. Its activities focus mainly on linking and mobilizing networks of institutions, organizations and individuals who have proven their commitment to the values of the Culture of Peace.

Through the Foundation for a Culture of Peace,  Mayor continues the task he began as director-general of UNESCO: that of promoting the transition from a culture of violence and force, to a culture of peace and tolerance. Each year the Foundation offers an annual Culture of Peace course in collaboration with the Juan Carlos I University of Madrid, with educational content including democracy, human rights, and the origin of conflicts. In December 2000, the Foundation organized an international conference attended by major figures in the struggle for justice, freedom, and peace. At the end of the conference, the Declaration of Madrid was adopted unanimously.

Federico Mayor Zaragoza calls for a new world order to extricate humanity from our present dilemma. A new ethical and moral order whose cultural, scientific and social dimensions balance economic and technology development. For our real goal in life is to improve the quality of life of each and everyone of us. This involves new forms of cooperation as the world is now one village.

Federico Mayor Zaragoza endorses the stand taken by UNESCO with regard to peace, disarmament, human rights and education. In the domain of information he suggests a new approach, warning against any monopoly control of communications, and denouncing the dangers of one sided information.

Federico Mayor Zaragoza argued that man is in a state of transformation; from Homo faber he is on the path to Homo sapiens. Knowledge liberates, and scientists have a crucial role to play. The new order proposed requires a proper use of knowledge- for knowledge, like all else, only exists through humanity and for humanity. It should thus be the focus of our reflections. All power to the imagination!

Since 2011, the Foundation for a Culture of Peace hosts the Global Program Women's Knowledge International devoted to: 1) develop an educational project of global reach to contribute to the production and dissemination of women's and feminist knowledge, 2) foster the growth of a socio-political conscience on gender equity among likeminded people and a wide range of actors, 3)build cultures of peace through women's produced knowledge.

Activities and research

Activities

The activity of the Foundation for a Culture of Peace is mainly based on the entailment and mobilization of networks of institutions, organizations and individuals that stand out by their commitment with the values for the culture of peace. The concrete actions of the foundation are mainly centered  in the divulging and educative areas.

Research

Federico Mayor Zaragoza published his book The World Ahead in 2000. The specific aim of the book, which he has drawn up in collaboration with Jerome Binde and with the assistance of Jean-Yves Le Saux, Ragnar Gudmundsson, and the team of UNESCO's Analysis and Forecasting Office, is to prepare people more thoroughly for the coming decades so that they may respond in good time to the challenges of the future. Federico Mayor argued that, as observed by Ilya Prigogine, We cannot predict the future because the future will never be as before. We can prepare for it because, far from being inscribed in a book of destiny, the future is uncertainty, bifurcation, unpredictable creation. It is in our hands, because the future is freedom- for the most part, it will be exactly what we make of it. We can prepare for the future, but are we prepared for the twenty-first century.

More recently, Mayor Zaragoza was working with Edward J. Nell (Professor of Economics at the New School for Social Research, New York) and Karim Errouaki  on a book called  Reinventing Globalization after the Crash (published in 2016). The book was prefaced by Boutros Boutros Ghali, and constituted a new blueprint of the Foundation for a Culture of Peace. The book is based on material provided by Federico Mayor Zaragoza's book The World Ahead (Zed Books, UNESCO, 2000), revisited and animated by the theoretical framework put forward by Edward J. Nell in General Theory of Transformational Growth (Cambridge University Press, 1998) and extended by Karim Errouaki (UM, HEC-Montreal, 2003)  who argued that Transformational Growth provides a new vision and a new framework, for thinking about economic development, bringing it into the framework of economic history.

Committee of experts 

In 2003–2004 Mayor Zaragoza sat on an ad hoc committee of experts, for which he was spokesman, set up to advise the Spanish government regarding the return of the polemical "Salamanca Papers" to the autonomous government of Catalonia. Comprising, among others, Columbia University Professor of History Edward Malefakis, and Juan Pablo Fusi, the committee declared in 2004, by a majority of 14 of its 17 members, that it was "just and legitimate" that the documents be returned to the autonomous government. The documents were finally transferred in 2005.

Publications

Mayor has published over 100 articles in scientific journals, especially from his time as a professor of biochemistry, when he wrote, for example, about metabolism in plants and numerous articles in popular journals. In addition to numerous scientific publications, Mayor has published numerous books and over seven books of poetry – A contraviento (1985), Aguafuertes (1991), El fuego y la esperanza (1996), Terral (1997), Voz de Vida, Voz Debida (2007), Alzare mi Voz (2007) and En Pie de Paz (2008). Mayor has also published more than seventy publications on education strategies, development, human resources and science and technology.

Books

Tomorrow Is Always Too Late, Stamford Publishing, 1992.
Memory of the Future, UNESCO Publishing, 1995
La Paix Demain?, UNESCO Publishing, 1995.
Science and Power, UNESCO Publishing, 1995
The New Page, UNESCO Publishing, 1995.
UNESCO: Un Idéal en Action, UNESCO Publishing, 1996.
The World Ahead: Our Future in the Making, Zed Books,2000.
Los Nudos Gordianos, Galaxia Gutenberg,1999.
La Palabra y la Espada, AEFLA, 2002
La Fuerza de la Palabra, Adhara, 2005
Un Dialogo Iberico en el marco europeo y mundial (with Mário Soares), Galxia Gutenberg, 2006.
Enfermedades Metabólicas (ed.) (2006)
Tiempo de Acción, 2008
Tiempo de Accion, Universidad de Granada, Editorial Anfora Nova, 2008
The Crime of Silence, 2011
Reinventing Globalization After the Crash (with Edward J. Nell and Karim Errouaki), forthcoming in 2012.
Economics and Management in Dialogue: Reinventing Management (Organizational Strategies through the Transformational Growth Lens), with Edward J. Nell and Karim Errouaki, forthcoming.

Interviews 
 Scholar Day of Peace and Non-violence, Global Education Magazine, 30 January 2013. During this interview, Mr. Mayor Zaragoza expressed: "In a moment in which we already can and already have freedom of speech, we have to get involved and committed. We have to be aware that we are still in time to change a culture of imposition, fear, a culture economically based on specula, on productive relocation, on war; we have the chance of changing it into a culture of dialogue, conciliation, alliance, into a culture of peace"

References 

1934 births
Complutense University of Madrid
Complutense University of Madrid alumni
Democratic and Social Centre (Spain) MEPs
Foreign Members of the Russian Academy of Sciences
Living people
Members of the constituent Congress of Deputies (Spain)
Members of the European Academy of Sciences and Arts
Members of the Institute for Catalan Studies
MEPs for Spain 1987–1989
Nonviolence advocates
Politicians from Barcelona
Recipients of the Great Cross of the National Order of Scientific Merit (Brazil)
Spanish academics
Spanish officials of the United Nations
UNESCO Directors-General
Union of the Democratic Centre (Spain) politicians